The 2nd Grand Prix de l'Alsace was a Grand Prix motor race held at Strasbourg-Neudorf in France on 3 August 1947. The race was won by Luigi Villoresi, who started from pole and set fastest lap, in a Maserati 4CL. Yves Giraud-Cabantous was second in a Talbot-Lago T26SS and Louis Rosier third in a Talbot-Lago T150SS.

Classification

References

Alsace
Alsace